KKCY (103.1 FM, "Country 103.1") is a radio station broadcasting a country music format. Licensed to Colusa, California, United States, the station serves the Yuba City-Marysville area.  The station is currently owned by Results Radio of Chico Licensee, LLC and features programming from Westwood One . The KKCY morning team of Dave & Briggs has anchored the station since 2003.

History
The station went on the air as KKLU at 96.5 MHz on 1989-06-05, from its co-located studio and transmitter site in downtown Colusa.  In January 1990, KKLU changed frequency to 103.1 and later that year, significantly increased coverage (now heard from Chico to Sacramento), when it began transmitting from the Sutter Buttes.  On 1990-09-08, the station changed its call sign to the current KKCY.

KKCY-HD2

KKCY’s sister station Power 95-5 broadcasts on the KKCY HD-2 sub-sub channel and is rebroadcast on 95.5 FM.

References

External links

KCY